Hasan Mahmood (born 1 January 1991) is a Pakistani cricketer. He made his first-class debut for Faisalabad in the 2007–08 Quaid-e-Azam Trophy on 26 December 2007.

References

External links
 

1991 births
Living people
Pakistani cricketers
Faisalabad cricketers
Faisalabad Wolves cricketers
Pakistan International Airlines cricketers
Punjab (Pakistan) cricketers
State Bank of Pakistan cricketers
Cricketers from Sargodha